Eser is an international construction company based in Ankara, Turkey, and active in the Middle East, Central Asia, East Europe and Sub-Saharan Africa. The company trades under the registered name of Eser Taahhüt ve Sanayi A.Ş. (English: Eser Contracting and Industry Co.Inc.). Eser is listed by Engineering News Record as one of the Top 225 International Contractors of the World.

The company has completed several construction projects, including dams, hydroelectric power plants, industrial plants, office buildings, water distribution networks, environmental projects, railways, roads, and bridges. Several of these projects were carried out abroad, in countries such as Nigeria, Afghanistan, Turkmenistan, Azerbaijan, and Cameroon and in particular Saudi Arabia, where their milestone project was the infrastructure for King Abdullah University near Jeddah. Eser was also involved in building the 554 km fast-train connection between Sirte and Benghazi in Libya.

The company's main activities involve dams, buildings such as commercial buildings, hydroelectric power plants, irrigation systems, drainage systems, pumping stations, highways, bridges and all kinds of infrastructure constructions, such as steel structures, sea ports and airports. In addition, the company is involved in industrial projects, energy lines, feasibility studies, consultancy, and project and construction management, among others.

Eser Contracting is part of Eser Holdings, active in the fields of Construction, Consulting Engineering, Power, Real Estate, Mechanical Industry and Trading.

External links 
 Official Web-Site of Eser

References 

Construction and civil engineering companies of Turkey
Companies based in Ankara
Construction and civil engineering companies established in 1986
Turkish companies established in 1986